Sir Alexander Fleming College (commonly known as Fleming College or simply Fleming) is a British school in Trujillo, northern Perú, it was the first English school outside Lima. Fleming College represents Cambridge University and is part of the British Schools of Peru (BSP) which includes other important English schools in Lima, such as  Markham College, Cambridge College, Newton College and San Silvestre School. Many of the Fleming staff are from various English and Spanish-speaking countries including England, the United States, Denmark, Scotland, Chile and Mexico. The school has approximately 700 students. It includes state of the art audio-visual rooms, electronic smart boards and computer and science labs. The school is named after Alexander Fleming.

As every British school around the world, Fleming has the house system, led by 4 house captains, 2 in primary and 2 in secondary, and a teacher house representative. The houses are named by important English men, in this case are; Jeffreys (named after Alexander Jeffreys), Hawkings (named after Stephen Hawkings) and Bannister (named after Roger Bannister).
The houses compete in different areas such as sports, during school olympics, academic and oral. At the end of the year, the house which won more points during the year, is awarded with the Annual House Prize.

Fleming is considered as one of the top schools in Trujillo, in terms of exclusiveness and academic excellence. Recently the school has been approved to offer the IBDP program and the PYP program, being the first school in northern-Peru to offer both programmes. Currently, students in primary and secondary are studying them. Also Fleming offers the International General Certificate of Secondary Education (IGCSE), by Cambridge University, in which students develop different attributes of the subjects chosen in English (except for the language courses, Spanish and French).

University affiliations
 Cambridge University
 Pontificia Universidad Catolica del Peru
 Instituto de Monterrey (Mexico)

External links
 Official website

Private schools in Peru